Bohumil Staša (29 April 1944 – 21 May 2019) was a Grand Prix motorcycle road racer from the former Czechoslovakia. Staša began his Grand Prix career in 1961. He enjoyed his best seasons as a rider for the ČZ factory racing team in 1968 and 1969, when he finished both seasons in eighth place in the 350cc world championship.

Motorcycle Grand Prix results 
Points system from 1950 to 1968:

Points system from 1969 onwards:

(key) (Races in italics indicate fastest lap)

References 

1944 births
2019 deaths
Czech motorcycle racers
Czechoslovak motorcycle racers
350cc World Championship riders
500cc World Championship riders